The SS Muskegon was a wooden hulled American passenger and package freight vessel that burned down on October 6, 1910 off the coast of Michigan City, Indiana in LaPorte County, Indiana, United States while unloading a cargo of sand. On April 26, 1989 the remains of the Muskegon were listed on the National Register of Historic Places.

History

Design and construction

The Muskegon was built as the Peerless in 1872, in Cleveland, Ohio by Ira Lafrinnier. She was launched on June 15, 1872. She had a gross tonnage of 1275.57 tons. She was powered by a 700 horsepower high pressure condensing engine, and fueled by two coal-fired firebox boilers. Both the engine and boilers were built by the Globe Iron Works of Cleveland, Ohio.

Service History
She entered service on July 3, 1872 with the Leopold & Austrian’s Lake Superior Line of Chicago, Illinois, and was given the registration number US20470. In September 1877 she jettisoned a cargo of flour, feed and sundries, about 26 of cattle and about 70 sheep.

The Peerless received repairs in August 1882. On November 26, 1884 she caught fire in Chicago, Illinois, and was repaired and overhauled the following year by the Chicago Dry Dock Company.

In November 1894 she was detained at Sault Ste. Marie, Michigan because of smallpox. In 1896 Peerless was sold to the Lake Michigan & Lake Superior Transportation Company of Chicago. On October 27, 1895 she broke her piston rod near St. Joseph, Michigan, and was rescued by the tug Perfection. In October 1898 her machinery became disabled, and she was towed to Marquette, Michigan. On September 7, 1899 the Peerless collided with the schooner A. Stewart and sank. She was raised four days later, and was repaired Howard's Bay, West Superior, Wisconsin.

In 1906 she was sold to the Chicago Transportation Company of Chicago. Around this time she was moored off Chicago, and used as a gambling vessel. In 1907 she was sold to the Muskegon & Chicago Navigation Company of Muskegon, Michigan, and was renamed Muskegon. In 1908 the Muskegon was converted to a bulk freighter by the Ship Owners Dry Dock Company of Chicago. In 1909 the Muskegon was sold to the Independent Sand Company of Chicago, she was also converted to a sandsucker in Muskegon.

Burning
On October 6, 1910 the Muskegon was unloading a cargo of sand at the Indiana Transportation Company's dock in Michigan City, Indiana, when a fire started in her hull. The fire was rumored to have been caused by a kerosene spillage near the boilers. The Muskegon burned to the waterline, and sank at the dock, and remained there until June 10, 1911 when she was refloated and towed out to the harbour to be scuttled. After her loss, the Independent Sand Company used the insurance money they received to buy the sandsucker J.D. Marshall.

The Muskegon today
A lot of machinery remains at the site, including the boilers, the propeller and propeller shaft. Also on the wreck are a number of gears that were once part of the engine.

References

1872 ships
Maritime incidents in 1910
National Register of Historic Places in LaPorte County, Indiana
Package freighters
Wreck diving sites in the United States